Sven-Erik Rosenlew (28 December 1902 – 30 July 1963) was a Finnish sports shooter. He competed in the trap event at the 1952 Summer Olympics.

References

1902 births
1963 deaths
Finnish male sport shooters
Olympic shooters of Finland
Shooters at the 1952 Summer Olympics
Sportspeople from Helsinki